Robert Michael Oliver Cooke (born 3 September 1943) is a former English cricketer.  Cooke was a left-handed batsman who bowled leg break googly.  He was born at Adlington, Cheshire.

References

External links
Bob Cooke at ESPNcricinfo
Bob Cooke at CricketArchive

1943 births
Living people
People from Adlington, Cheshire
English cricketers
Cheshire cricketers
Minor Counties cricketers
Essex cricketers
Cricketers from Cheshire